Hofors Municipality (Hofors kommun) is a municipality in Gävleborg County, east central Sweden.

The first municipality with the name of Hofors was broken away from Torsåker in 1925. In 1971 the two entities were reunited to form the present municipality.

The coat of arms stem from 1968, and is derived from a map from 1539, where the town Hofors was surrounded by iron mines..

Geography 
Nearest cities are Gävle, 50 kilometers away, and Falun, 30 kilometers away.

Localities 
 Hofors (seat)
 Torsåker

Sister cities 
Two sister cities:
 Denmark: Fladså, 
 Finland: Kontiolahti

Until recently, Tokke in Norway was a sister city, but it has for some reason been discontinued. 
()

References

External links

Municipalities of Gävleborg County